Local Food Plus (LFP) was a Toronto-based non-profit organization that brought farmers and consumers together to build regional food economies. It created "LFP certified" farmers and processors in Ontario, Atlantic Canada, British Columbia and the Canadian Prairies who used sustainable practices, and helped connect farmers and buyers, in part through a "Buy to Vote" campaign, based on the notion of voting with one's money.

This certification is not as fully considered as, for example, organic certification, but because it considers a wide range of 'ethical' points, the consumer may be able to purchase a well-rounded and 'morally' sound item if it bears the LFP label.

The organization was founded in 2005 by Lori Stahlbrand and Mike Schreiner, and was run by the Land Food People Foundation from 2008. Local Food Plus ceased operation in 2014.

See also

 Food Security
 Sustainable Agriculture
 Foodland Ontario
 Geography of food
 Right to food
 Food rescue

References

 Cooper, Kathryn (2008). "Local Food Plus: A Model for Food Citizenship in North America" WORLDCHANGING.
 Porter, Catherine (2007). "Food growers target customers with a conscience", Toronto Star.
 Towe, Brian (2008). "Group Helps Local Farmers", Metro Toronto.
 Choose Your Food "Food Certification Overview" Local Food Plus

External links
 

Agricultural organizations based in Canada
Organizations established in 2005
Organizations disestablished in 2014
2005 establishments in Ontario
2014 disestablishments in Ontario
Defunct organizations based in Canada